Theatre and disability is a subject focusing on the inclusion of disability within a theatrical experience, enabling cultural and aesthetic diversity in the arts. Showing disabled bodies on stage can be to some extent understood as a political aesthetic as it challenges the predominately abled audience's expectations as well as traditional theatre conventions. However, the performance of disabilities on stage has raised polarizing debates about whether the performers are exposed and reduced to their disability or whether they have full agency of who they are and what they represent.

History 
Disability in the theatre has been a prevalent and sensitive topic for centuries. More often than not, a theatrical production will choose to include the use of actors within a role of a character without any limitations. Some characters are also written without disabilities. Millions of patrons attend the theatre each year, allowing them to gain insight and become educated on various social and political topics. Without the inclusion of disability in the arts, millions of people would feel distanced or neglected from the rest of the theatrical community. There have been different forms of expressive therapy, more specifically drama therapy, as a form of therapy where people use dramatic tools to comfort and improve physical and mental health. Although found beneficial, it does not take the place of artistic achievement that people with disabilities strive for.

Disability theatre formally arose out of the disability arts and culture movement in the 1980s in the United States and the United Kingdom. There were, however, some disability-focused theatre companies predating this movement, including the National Theatre of the Deaf, founded in 1967. Notable early disability theatre companies include Graeae Theatre Company (1980 - UK), Theatre Terrific (1985 - Canada), and Back to Back Theatre (1988 - Australia).

People with disabilities represent the largest minority group in America. They make up 20% of the population, yet are not perceived as such by people living without disabilities, and because of this the debate continues as to whether or not it is appropriate, and respectful, to personify people with disabilities in theatrical works.

Inclusion of disabled characters in theatrical works

United States

Tennessee Williams 
In The Glass Menagerie, Tennessee Williams explains to the readers that the character Laura has grown up with a disability. "A childhood illness has left her crippled, one leg slightly shorter than the other, and held in a brace. This defect need not be more than suggested on the stage." This character description is vague enough to allow the director of this production to make their own decision as to how they want to portray Laura. There is enough ambiguity for the director to take the responsibility of showcasing disability as they see fit.

John Belluso 
John Belluso was an American playwright known for his work focusing on what its like living in society with a disability. Similar to many of his characters, Belluso was diagnosed with a rare bone disorder, causing him to live in a wheelchair for the remainder of his life.

Gretty Good Time is a play that centres around a woman with post-polio paralysis. The audience rides the journey with Gretty as she is transported to a state institution where she will soon be unable to function on her own, therefore making her contemplate assisted suicide.

The 2005 play The Rules of Charity is a story about Monty, a man living with cerebral palsy who uses a wheelchair. His daughter Loretta acts as his caretaker, and much of the play focuses on her relationship with her father and what it is like trying to balance her life as well as her fathers.

Mike Lew 
Asian-American playwright Mike Lew recreates the famous tale of William Shakespeare's Richard III, with the titular character being one the most famous disabled and deformed characters in history. Mike parodies this in his play Teenage Dick. The play centres around sixteen year old Richard, whose goal is to become senior class president. Richard has cerebral palsy, and the audience learns the tribulations of trying to overcome heavy obstacles in a cut throat environment. Teenage Dick was performed at the Public Theatre in New York City in early 2016.

Ali Stroker 
In 2019 Ali Stroker made history by being the first wheelchair user to win a Tony, this for her role as Ado Annie in the 2019 revival of Rodgers and Hammerstein's Oklahoma! The role was not originally written for a character in a wheelchair, but Stroker fit the updated staging of the show.

"Hi, Are You Single?" 
Produced by Woolly Mammoth Theatre Company in association with IAMA Theatre Company, "Hi, Are You Single?" is a one-man show starring and written by disabled actor Ryan J. Haddad and directed by Lauren Savia, which ran from March to April 2022. This show follows the adventures of Ryan, a gay man with cerebral palsy, as he navigates love, inaccessible gay bars, and Grindr. Its run included three open captioned performances, three ASL interpreted performances, and two audio described performances. In a review by Tavish Young, the show is remarked to be an intimate look at the intersection of identities when it comes to love. Young also states that the show is a candid look into sensuality and disability where Haddad addresses and engages with the audience multiple times throughout the production.

"Wicked" 
Wicked is a musical by Stephen Schwartz and Winnie Holzman. It has been running on Broadway since 2003, and has launched multiple national tours and productions worldwide. In the musical, the character of Elphaba has a sister who is in a wheelchair named Nessarose. She was disabled at birth due to a congenital birth defect, and goes through the production inhabiting the role of villain. Over the course of Wicked's run, it has not cast a physically disabled actor in the role of Nessarose. Recently, however, in the announced movie adaptation of Wicked, director Jon M. Chu has launched a search for an actor who is a wheelchair user to be cast in the role of Nessarose, whether they are ambulatory or non-ambulatory. This movie is slated to start filming in the summer of 2022.

"She Kills Monsters" 
She Kills Monsters is a play written by Qui Nguyen that revolves around an adventure involving family and the popular fantasy game Dungeons and Dragons. It has had numerous productions at universities and regional theatres, and an Off-Broadway run in 2011. One of the characters by the name of Kelly/Kaliope is said in the stage directions to have cerebral palsy when she is her real-life self, but non-disabled when she is her Dungeons and Dragons character. Notably, there have been productions of this show that have cast disabled actors in the role of Kelly/Kaliope such as, &Sons Theatre in New Mexico, the University of California, Riverside in 2021, and Mount St. Joseph University in 2021.

"The Phantom of the Opera" 
The Phantom of the Opera is a musical by Andrew Lloyd Webber and Charles Hart that premiered on Broadway in 1988. It is the longest running musical in Broadway's history, totalling over 24 years. It centres around the masked character of the Phantom, who inhabits and haunts an old Parisian Opera House in the 19th century. It is discovered throughout the production that this character keeps himself masked due to the fact that his face is disfigured, scared of any judgement from the people he encounters. In the last scene of the musical, his romantic interest, Christine, takes off his mask and the extent of his disfigurement is revealed to the audience. In this moment, the intricate make up that is put on the actor for every production is showcased.

Representations

Disability mimicry 
The practice of disability mimicry and the persistent use of disability as a narrative device has been present throughout history as, "Stories about disability in cultural productions document society's reaction to and treatment of people with disabilities". Blake Howe is the editor of the Musical Representations of Disability database, which contains "musical works that feature a representation of disability or a disabled person", from 1400 to the present day. Disability theorist Tobin Siebers explains that, "non-disabled performers in disabled roles highlights their able-bodiedness and therefore constitutes the erasure of authentic disability."

Diverse and inclusive casting 
The group Opera and Disability, have two rules to follow when casting a role related to a marginalized population:

Organizations supporting disabled artists

Access All Areas
Founded in 1976 Access All Areas is a British Theatre Company, based in London, who work primarily with learning disabled and autistic artists. They run a diploma in Performance Making for learning disabled and autistic adults in collaboration with the Central School of Speech and Drama, run artist development schemes, and manage a company of professional disabled performers.

Alliance for Inclusion in the Arts

The Alliance for Inclusion in the Arts supports and promotes the inclusion of disabled people in all realms of performing and fine arts. Through various programming, Inclusion in the Arts aims to increase diversity throughout the United States.

"Our principal aim is to achieve full inclusion in American arts and entertainment, such that what we see on our screens and stages truly reflects the society in which we live." The Alliance for Inclusion in the Arts is supported by several national associations including The Shubert Foundation, Actors' Equity Association, and the Screen Actors Guild. In addition, the grassroots disability centered film production company Crip Video Productions, who collaborate with theatres on accessibility, cast their films with Alliance for Inclusion In The Arts. Alliance for Inclusion In The Arts is no longer functioning.

Barrier-Free

Barrier-Free is a registered 501(c)(3) non-profit in the state of Maryland whose mission is to “provide inclusive art, self-advocacy, and social programming” to the community for adults with disabilities (namely autism).  Barrier-Free was founded by Britt Burr and Lauren Burr in the year 2017 and incorporated into non-profit in 2019.

Barrier-Free's inclusive theatre companies follow a multi-step approach where actors with disabilities, staff, and mentors come together to create original one-act shows to be performed at the end of each season.  Actors rehearse for seven months before performing their shows on stage at McDaniel College.  By participating in these inclusive theatre companies, Barrier-Free hopes to instil their actors with confidence and life skills to engage with society.

Broadway Accessibility Initiative

In 2012, Broadway musicals The Lion King and Newsies partnered with the Broadway Accessibility/Audience Expansion Initiative and Inclusion of the Arts to allow people with disabilities to receive the same theatrical experience as those without. The services now being provided are I-Caption for those who are deaf and hard of hearing, and D-Scriptive for blind audience members. The Lion King became the first autistic friendly performance in 2011.

Deaf West Theatre

Deaf West Theatre put on a production of Spring Awakening that premiered in Los Angeles, California and later transferred to Broadway in 2015.

Nearly half of the actors were deaf in this production. This new adaptation shed light on the power of disabled actors in the theater.

Disability Art and Culture Project

The aims of Disability Art and Culture Project is to support and advance artistic interest of those with apparent and non-apparent disabilities. In support of their mission statement, the DACP advocates for the artistic and creative interests of those who are disabled.

GRAEae Theatre Company
GRAEae is a UK disabled arts theatre company that is run by the artistic director Jenny Sealey. The company in based at the Bradbury Studios in East London, where the studio is the first in the UK to have creative access at the core of its design. Funded by the UK Arts Council England, GRAEae's remit is to give disabled actors, directors, playwright, theatre workers and staff the opportunity to create ground-breaking and astonishing work that is accessible to all. GRAEae signature characteristic is their integration of sign language, captioning and audio description which works exceedingly well with both disabled and non-disabled audiences. Their work force challenges world-class-theatre and breaks down the barriers that stand in the way of deaf and disabled artist.

The company welcomes different communities such as Disability Arts, Deaf, Learning Disability, Mental Health, Inclusive Arts and many more. Their funding from the Arts Council England enables support from several charities as they are a registered charity themselves. The support received helps deliver professional development in training for disabled performers and writers and supports the work with both disabled and non-disabled young people in schools and youth groups across the UK.

Although premiering in 2005 at the Kiln Theatre, London, by Winsome Pinnock, in 2019 GRAEae staged One Under at the Arcola Theatre, where ticket buyers could watch the 1-hour, 40-minute (no interval) show from 10 to 21 December. One Under was a 16+ performance that spoke on the topic of mental health (one of the topics they advocate) and goes through the journey of guilt and the fragility of human relationships. The staging of the play included the company's integration of audio description for deaf audience members, which was praised by The Stage – "Captioning and audio description are creatively incorporated into a bold revival of Winsome Pinnock's play about the need for atonement."

The British Theatre Guide also commented – "Guilt and penance, paranoia, hidden disability, personality and uncertainty shift and re-shape as 95 minutes scurries past… a brave re-imaging and revival of Alfred Fagon award-winner Winsome Pinnock's 2005 short play."

GRAEae's One Under was rated four stars by The Spy In The Stalls, Beyond The Curtains, North West End and East Midlands Theatre.

National Theater of the Deaf
Starting in 1967 in the United States, the National Theater of the Deaf began producing shows with both Spoken Word and American Sign Language. This allowed the shows to bring in a larger audience, giving them the capability to challenge the way the audience members use their senses. This new type of theatre broke barriers as it incorporated a new form of language into the theatre.

Nicu's Spoon Theatre
Nicu's Spoon Theater Company is a fully inclusive theater company in New York City, Hawaii and Virginia, founded in 2001 by three women. The companies mission is to cast disabled and actors of color and practice rigorous inclusion in all things creative. The company also educates, lectures and advises other companies on the many ways to begin to be inclusive in their own productions.

Phamaly Theatre Company
Phamaly Theatre Company is a disability-affirmative theatre company in Denver, Colorado, founded in 1989 by five theatre artists with disabilities. The company's mission is to is to be a creative home for theatre artists with disabilities; to model a disability-affirmative theatrical process; and to upend conventional narratives by transforming individuals, audiences, and the world. Phamaly exclusively casts actors with all nature of disabilities: physical, cognitive, intellectual, and emotional. The company provides accessibility services for artists and audiences including captioning, audio description, American Sign Language interpretation, sensory friendly performances, tactile tours, Braille materials, sensory guides, and wheelchair access.

An audience's perspective
Within the Alliance for Inclusion in the Arts, disabled actors are often asked to submit their headshot and resume, and it is ultimately up to the creative team on how the wish to portray disabled characters. Without an advocate for people with disabilities, oftentimes they go unnoticed when casting a production. According to the Gay and Lesbian Alliance Against Defamation (GLAAD) in 2013, out of the 796 regular characters on broadcast primetime, only one percent was depicted as people with disabilities.

References